Langley K-8, formerly Langley High School, is a public school in the Sheraden neighborhood of Pittsburgh, Pennsylvania, United States.

Langley was one of ten high schools in the Pittsburgh Public Schools. On November 23, 2011, the Pittsburgh Board of Education approved a reform plan that would close Langley High School as an active school for the 2012–13 school year. The staff and student body would be relocated to the nearby Brashear High School, the district revealed plans for the Langley building to remain open as a middle school grades 6–8.

Langley later reopened to serve students grade K-8.

The building is an example of Tudor Revival architecture with the portions completed in 1923 and 1927 designed by MacClure & Spahr and is listed on the National Register of Historic Places. The high school is named for aviation pioneer and one-time University of Pittsburgh professor Samuel P. Langley.

References

External links
Pittsburgh Public Schools

Defunct schools in Pennsylvania
School buildings on the National Register of Historic Places in Pennsylvania
High schools in Pittsburgh
School buildings completed in 1927
City of Pittsburgh historic designations
Pittsburgh History & Landmarks Foundation Historic Landmarks
Public high schools in Pennsylvania
1923 establishments in Pennsylvania
National Register of Historic Places in Pittsburgh